Illinois Route 47 (IL 47) is a  largely rural north–south state highway that runs from the Wisconsin state border at Highway 120 near Hebron, to IL 10, just south of Interstate 72 (I-72) near Seymour. IL 47 is in primarily rural areas but in several suburbs of Chicago, such as Woodstock, traffic can be heavily congested.

IL 47 crosses most interstate highways in northern and central Illinois, but the largest towns that it serves are Woodstock (at US 14), Huntley (at I-90), Lily Lake at (IL 64), Elburn (at IL 38), Sugar Grove (at US 30), Yorkville (at US 34), Morris (at I-80), Dwight (at I-55), Forrest (at US 24), Gibson City (at IL 54), and Mahomet (at I-74).

Route description

Route 47 also shares concurrencies with Illinois Route 9 and Illinois 54 in Gibson City, U.S. Route 30 in Sugar Grove, U.S. Route 6 in Morris, Historic U.S. Route 66 in Dwight, and U.S. Route 150 in Mahomet.

History
The original route ended near where it ends today, however, in 1937, it was extended to Decatur via portions of modern day IL 10 and IL 105. Only eight years later (in 1945) was it shortened back to Monticello (the old route became IL 105). One final change came in 1980 when IL 47 was moved back to its current southern terminus at IL 10 after I-72 was built in the area.

Modern-day improvements started occurring further north as early as 2009. A project to reconstruct the road to 4 lanes from Kreutzer Road to Reed Road through Huntley was completed in October 2011, including completing all ramps at the I-90 interchange. IL 47 was widened from I-80 in Morris to Caton Farm Road south of Yorkville as part of the Prairie Parkway study–work was completed in 2015. In 2015, the project to expand the section between IL 71 and Kennedy Road in Yorkville to 4-lanes was completed. The partial interchange with I-88 between Sugar Grove and Elburn was made full with the completion of the missing ramps (using electronic toll collection) in 2019.

Future
The Illinois Department of Transportation is proposing to add lanes to several portions of Illinois Route 47, which eventually would make it a 4-lane road from I-80 in Morris to I-88 in Sugar Grove, and from I-90 in Huntley to north of Woodstock.

Major intersections

References

External links

 Illinois Highway Ends: Illinois Route 47
 IL 47 Improvement Study (Yorkville to Sugar Grove)
 IL 47 Improvement Study (Woodstock)
 IL 47 Corridor Planning Study (Sugar Grove to Hebron)

047
Transportation in Champaign County, Illinois
Transportation in Ford County, Illinois
Transportation in Livingston County, Illinois
Transportation in Grundy County, Illinois
Transportation in Kendall County, Illinois
Transportation in Kane County, Illinois
Transportation in McHenry County, Illinois